Rykener is a surname. Notable people with the surname include:

 John/Eleanor Rykener, 14th-century transvestite or transgender sex worker
 Edgar Rykener, fictional character in the works of Bruce Holsinger

English-language surnames